Gainbridge Fieldhouse is an indoor arena located in downtown Indianapolis, Indiana, United States. It opened in November 1999 to replace Market Square Arena. The arena is the home of the Indiana Pacers of the National Basketball Association and the Indiana Fever of the Women's National Basketball Association. The fieldhouse also hosts college basketball games (including the annual Big Ten Conference tournaments), indoor concerts, and ice hockey.

The arena was originally named Conseco Fieldhouse, as the naming rights to the venue were sold to Conseco, a financial services organization based in nearby Carmel. In May 2010, the company renamed itself as CNO Financial Group, but the fieldhouse retained the Conseco name. In December 2011, CNO Financial Group changed the name of the fieldhouse to Bankers Life Fieldhouse, after one of its subsidiaries, Bankers Life and Casualty. CNO decided not to renew its naming sponsorship after it expired on June 30, 2019. On September 27, 2021, the fieldhouse announced that Indianapolis-based financial platform Gainbridge would be the new naming partner for the fieldhouse in a multi-year partnership.

In April 2019, the Marion County Capital Improvement Board approved a major renovation project for the fieldhouse. The $360 million project will include a new outdoor entry plaza, new indoor gathering areas, and various interior enhancements. The Pacers committed to remaining in Indianapolis for at least 25 more years as part of the renovation agreement. Construction will take place in two phases, with the fieldhouse having planned to host the 2021 NBA All-Star Game in between the phases, which was later canceled due to the COVID-19 pandemic. Almost all of the construction work took place during Pacers offseasons. The project displaced the Fever for all of the 2020 and 2021 WNBA seasons, as well as part of the 2022 season; for 2022, the Fever played the first section of the schedule at Gainbridge Fieldhouse, but after the NBA season ended, the Fever played games at Indiana Farmers Coliseum.

The arena was built to evoke an Indiana high school and college field house. As such, unlike most other North American sports arenas, it was designed primarily for basketball. The arena can accommodate an NHL-sized rink, but the ice hockey seating capacity is reduced to 12,300 in an asymmetrical configuration.

Events
The first NBA game held at Conseco Fieldhouse was on November 6, 1999, when the Indiana Pacers played their regular-season home opener against the Boston Celtics. Later that same season, the Pacers made it to the 2000 NBA Finals against the Los Angeles Lakers. Games 3, 4, and 5 of that championship series were held at Conseco Fieldhouse, but the Pacers ended up losing that season's title four games to two.

In 2000, the fieldhouse was also the site for the 2000 Ray Miron President's Cup finals, with two games of the series being played there. The Indianapolis Ice won the series against the now-defunct Columbus Cottonmouths 4 games to 3.

Several games of the 2002 FIBA World Championship were played at Conseco Fieldhouse, including the semifinals and the final.

In 2009, Conseco Fieldhouse was the site for the 2009 WNBA Finals. The Indiana Fever took on the Phoenix Mercury for games 3 and 4 of that series but ended up losing the series. Three years later, the Fever hosted the 2012 WNBA Finals for games 3 and 4 and beat the Minnesota Lynx.

Additionally, the Indiana Firebirds of the Arena Football League played at the fieldhouse from 2001 to 2004 and the Indianapolis Ice of the Central Hockey League also played at the fieldhouse from 1999 to 2004. The venue also hosted select games for the Indiana Ice of the United States Hockey League.

From 2002 to 2007, the fieldhouse served as the site of the Big Ten Conference men's basketball tournament in even-numbered years while the tournament was held at the United Center in Chicago in odd-numbered years. In 2008, the tournament was moved to Conseco Fieldhouse exclusively for five years, through 2012. The arena is also a frequent site of the Big Ten women's basketball tournament. 2012 marked the 12th time in 13 years that the tournament had been held at the fieldhouse. On June 5, 2011, the Big Ten Conference announced that beginning in 2013 the location of both of the conference basketball tournaments for the following four years would be alternated between the Chicago area and Indianapolis. Bankers Life Fieldhouse would again be the site for both men's and women's events in 2014 and 2016. The 2011 NCAA Women's Final Four was also held at the fieldhouse on April 3 and April 5 of 2011. For basketball, the venue seats 17,923 (18,345 from 1999 to 2006, 18,165 from 2006 to 2016).

From 2011 to 2021 the fieldhouse hosted the Crossroads Classic, an annual event that included the Butler Bulldogs, Indiana Hoosiers, Notre Dame Fighting Irish, and Purdue Boilermakers men's basketball teams.

The Professional Bull Riders brought its Built Ford Tough Series bull riding tour, now known as the Unleash the Beast Series, to the fieldhouse for the first time in January 2011. It was their second visit to Indianapolis; they first visited Indianapolis during the 2004 season when they held a BFTS event at the RCA Dome.

Gainbridge Fieldhouse is one of many concert venues in the city of Indianapolis. On March 11, 2019, Metallica set a new attendance record at the venue with 18,274 fans at the venue. The previous record was held by Billy Joel (16,594).

In December 2017, during a press conference the Indiana Pacers announced that the arena would host the 2021 NBA All-Star Game. In late 2020, due to the COVID-19 pandemic and other conflicts surrounding the 2021 NCAA Division I men's basketball tournament which was also being held in Indianapolis the same year the NBA announced the city will host the 2024 NBA All-Star Game instead of the 2021 game.

NCAA tournament 
Gainbridge Fieldhouse hosted first and second-round games of the 2017 and 2022 NCAA tournaments. The arena also hosted first, second, and regional semifinal (Sweet 16) round games of the 2021 tournament.

High school sports
In addition to professional events, the arena also hosts the IHSAA state finals in wrestling as well as both girls and boys basketball. It also occasionally hosts other high school tournaments as well.

Concerts

Wrestling
WWE has hosted many shows such as Raw and SmackDown.

WCW has hosted the PPV event Sin (2001).

It also hosted many PPV events such as The Great American Bash (2006), SummerSlam (2008), Survivor Series (2012), and Clash of Champions (2016).

The fieldhouse is notable for being the location of many landmark moments for the professional wrestling group The Shield, who debuted on November 18, 2012, at Survivor Series, broke up on the June 2, 2014 episode of WWE Raw and reunited on the October 9, 2017 episode of WWE Raw.

Auto racing
In 2015, the fieldhouse hosted the Indy Invitational, with midget car racing and outlaw kart racing held on a dirt track erected on the arena floor.

Awards and recognitions
In 2005 and 2006, Conseco Fieldhouse was ranked the No. 1 venue in the NBA according to the Sports Business Journal/Sports Business Daily Reader Survey. In 2006 The Ultimate Sports Road Trip reaffirmed Conseco Fieldhouse as the best venue in all 4 of the major sports leagues. "The Ultimate Sports Road Trip has recently concluded a re-scoring and re-evaluation of all 122 franchises in the four major sports, based on our personal visits to each of the teams in a journey that began in 1998. Based on our criteria, Conseco Fieldhouse has again withstood scrutiny to be named the "best of the best" in the four major sports. Everything about Conseco Fieldhouse is top notch, a sparkling venue in a sparkling city," said Farrell and Kulyk.

In October 2004, the fieldhouse hosted the 2004 FINA Short Course World Swimming Championships. A 25-meter 300,000-gallon competition pool and 174,000-gallon warm-up pool were temporarily installed. A total of 71,659 tickets were sold for the four-day event. On the evening of Saturday, October 11, 2004, the crowd set a record for the largest attendance at a U.S. Swimming event outside of the Olympics with 11,488 people.

Scoreboard
In 2012, a giant state-of-the-art scoreboard was added to Bankers Life Fieldhouse. In addition to the HD screens running the length of the court, the innovative rectangular scoreboard design is capped by a  full 1080p HD video screen facing each baseline. The result of the design is a greatly improved visual experience from nearly every seat in the building. Additionally, a new sound system was installed.

Arena football
The fieldhouse was home to the Indiana Firebirds of the Arena Football League from 2001 to 2004 after moving from Albany, New York.

Seating capacity

Gallery

See also

List of basketball arenas
List of music venues
List of indoor arenas in the United States
List of National Basketball Association arenas
List of American Basketball Association arenas
List of attractions and events in Indianapolis

Notes

References

External links

 
 The Ultimate Sports Road Trip profile 
 Bankers Life Fieldhouse Seating Charts 
 Interview with Bankers Life Fieldhouse Executive Chef Chris Albano

1999 establishments in Indiana
Basketball venues in Indiana
Indiana Fever venues
Indiana Pacers venues
Indoor arenas in Indiana
National Basketball Association venues
Sports venues completed in 1999
Sports venues in Indianapolis
Music venues in Indiana
Wrestling venues in Indiana
Gymnastics venues in Indiana
Ice hockey venues in Indiana
Rodeo venues in the United States